Inika McPherson (born September 29, 1986, in Port Arthur, Texas) is an American track and field athlete specializing in the high jump. She was the 2013 and 2014 US Indoor champion. She also won the women's high jump at the 2014 USA Outdoor Track and Field Championships by clearing 2.00 m for the first time. McPherson has many tattoos and has had a variety of hairstyles, including mohawks.

Early career
She was a 2005 graduate of Memorial High School, of Port Arthur, Texas where she was freshman state champion and a six foot high jumper as a freshman in high school. McPherson shares the freshman high school record with Amy Acuff 6 ft. Was also named ESPN female high jumper of the decade.  Her high school best was 6'2" (1.87 m).  She also excelled in the triple jump and lettered in four sports, was Texas University Interscholastic League All-State and carried a 5.0 GPA.

College
Her next stop was the University of California, Berkeley where she set the school indoor record and was a three time NCAA All American, though she didn't get back to the range of her 6'2" from high school. Due to an injury she battled with during her years at Cal which caused her to have ankle surgery on her take off foot in 2008. In 2009 McPherson  came off ankle surgery and captured the Pac 10 Championship title and named female Athlete of the year at the University of California.

Professional
She has represented the United States at the 2016 Rio Olympics, 2007 Pan American Games, the 2011 and 2013 World Championships and the 2012 and 2014 World Indoor Championships.  Her improvements have been in bursts.  She moved into the rarefied air of elite competition by going 1.95 at the 2012 Mt. SAC Relays, still finishing second to the eventual Olympic silver medalist Brigetta Barrett.

Doping sanction
McPherson tested positive for benzoylecgonine, the main metabolite of cocaine, at the 2014 USA Outdoor Track and Field Championships and subsequently accepted a 21-month doping ban through March 2016.

International competitions

Personal life 
In 2014, she and Regina George announced on social media that they are in a relationship.

References

External links
 
 
 
 
 
 

1986 births
American sportspeople in doping cases
Doping cases in athletics
Living people
American female high jumpers
Athletes (track and field) at the 2016 Summer Olympics
Olympic track and field athletes of the United States
Lesbian sportswomen
LGBT people from Texas
American LGBT sportspeople
LGBT track and field athletes
USA Indoor Track and Field Championships winners
Athletes (track and field) at the 2007 Pan American Games
Pan American Games track and field athletes for the United States
California Golden Bears women's track and field athletes